Ilias Talikriadis (born 10 July 1965) is a retired Greek football goalkeeper.

References

1965 births
Living people
Greek footballers
Xanthi F.C. players
Olympiacos F.C. players
Iraklis Thessaloniki F.C. players
Kastoria F.C. players
Aris Thessaloniki F.C. players
Super League Greece players
Association football goalkeepers
Greece international footballers
Footballers from Xanthi